SMS Amazone was a three-masted sail corvette (caravel) of the Prussian Navy. Her keel was laid down in Grabow near Stettin in 1842 and she was launched on 24 June 1843. Amazone sank in a storm on 14 November 1861 off the coast of the Netherlands with 107 dead. She was reported to have collided with an East Indiaman, which rescued the three survivors. Among the dead were "almost all" of the naval cadets being trained to officer the fleet.

She had a complement of 145 men and was armed with twelve Swedish 18-pounders.

The ship served as a training vessel for Prussian naval officers of the Navigation School in Danzig, therefore it came under the Ministry of Finance rather than the Ministry of War. Nevertheless, she flew the Prussian war flag.

References

External links
deutsche-schutzgebiete.de webpage about SMS Amazone (in German)

Shipwrecks in the North Sea
Ships built in Stettin
Maritime incidents in November 1861
1843 ships
Ships of the Prussian Navy